Jean Toulout (28 September 1887 – 23 October 1962) was a French film actor. He appeared in more than 100 films between 1911 and 1959.

Selected filmography

 La Digue (1911)
 The Mask of Horror (1912)
 The Tenth Symphony (1918)
 La Fête espagnole (1920)
 Jacques Landauze (1920)
 Mathias Sandorf (1921)
 The Black Diamond (1922)
 Au Secours! (1924)
 Princess Masha (1927)
 Antoinette Sabrier (1927)
 Beyond the Street (1929)
 Monte Cristo (1929)
 The Three Masks (1929)
 Tenderness (1930)
 Levy and Company (1930)
 Nights of Princes (1930)
 Moritz Makes his Fortune (1931)
 Southern Cross (1932)
 L'Épervier (1933)
 The Queen of Biarritz (1934)
 Moscow Nights (1934)
 Stradivarius (1935)
 Mercadet (1936)
 Nuits de feu (1937)
 Miarka (1937)
 The Red Dancer (1937)
 Arlette and Love (1943)
 Doctor Laennec (1949)
 The Secret of Mayerling (1949)
 Edward and Caroline (1951)
 La Fugue de Monsieur Perle (1952)
 Three Days to Live (1957)

References

External links

1887 births
1962 deaths
French male film actors
French male silent film actors
Male actors from Paris
20th-century French male actors